FBH may refer to:r
 Ferdinand-Braun-Institut, a German research institute
 FBD Holdings, an Irish  company